A hard disk drive platter or hard disk is the circular magnetic disk on which digital data is stored in a hard disk drive. The rigid nature of the platters is what gives them their name (as opposed to the flexible materials which are used to make floppy disks). Hard drives typically have several platters which are mounted on the same spindle. A platter can store information on both sides, typically requiring two recording heads per platter, one per surface.

Design 

The magnetic surface of each platter is divided into small sub-micrometer-sized magnetic regions, each of which is used to represent a single binary unit of information. A typical magnetic region on a hard-disk platter (as of 2006) is about 200–250 nanometers wide (in the radial direction of the platter) and extends about 25–30 nanometers in the down-track direction (the circumferential direction on the platter), corresponding to about 100 billion bits per square inch of disk area (15.5 Gbit/cm2). The material of the main magnetic medium layer is usually a cobalt-based alloy. In today's hard drives each of these magnetic regions is composed of a few hundred magnetic grains, which are the base material that gets magnetized. As a whole, each magnetic region will have a magnetization.

One reason magnetic grains are used as opposed to a continuous magnetic medium is that they reduce the space needed for a magnetic region. In continuous magnetic materials, formations called Néel spikes tend to appear. These are spikes of opposite magnetization, and form for the same reason that bar magnets will tend to align themselves in opposite directions. These cause problems because the spikes cancel each other's magnetic field out, so that at region boundaries, the transition from one magnetization to the other will happen over the length of the Néel spikes. This is called the transition width.

Grains help solve this problem because each grain is in theory a single magnetic domain (though not always in practice). This means that the magnetic domains cannot grow or shrink to form spikes, and therefore the transition width will be on the order of the diameter of the grains. Thus, much of the development in hard drives has been in reduction of grain size.

Manufacture 

Platters are typically made using an aluminium, glass or ceramic substrate. As of 2015, laptop hard drive platters are made from glass while aluminum platters are often found in desktop computers.  In disk manufacturing, a thin coating is deposited on both sides of the substrate, mostly by a vacuum deposition process called magnetron sputtering. The coating has a complex layered structure consisting of various metallic (mostly non-magnetic) alloys as underlayers, optimized for the control of the crystallographic orientation and the grain size of the actual magnetic media layer on top of them, i.e. the film storing the bits of information. On top of it a protective carbon-based overcoat is deposited in the same sputtering process. In post-processing a nanometer thin polymeric lubricant layer gets deposited on top of the sputtered structure by dipping the disk into a solvent solution, after which the disk is buffed by various processes  to eliminate small defects and verified by a special sensor on a flying head for absence of any remaining asperities or other defects (where the size of the bit given above roughly sets the scale for what constitutes a significant defect size). In the hard-disk drive the hard-drive heads fly and move radially over the surface of the spinning platters to read or write the data. Extreme smoothness, durability, and perfection of finish are required properties of a hard-disk platter.

In 1990, Toshiba released the MK1122FC, the first hard drive to use a glass substrate, replacing the aluminium alloys used in earlier hard drives. It was originally designed for laptops, for which the greater shock resistance of glass substrates are more suitable. Around 2000, other hard drive manufacturers started transitioning from aluminum to glass platters because glass platters have several advantages over aluminum platters.

In 2005–06, a major shift in technology of hard-disk drives and of magnetic disks/media began. Originally, in-plane magnetized materials were used to store the bits but has now been replaced by perpendicular recording.

The reason for this transition is the need to continue the trend of increasing storage densities, with perpendicularly oriented media offering a more stable solution for a decreasing bit size. Orienting the magnetization perpendicular to the disk surface has major implications for the disk's deposited structure and the choice of magnetic materials, as well as for some of the other components of the hard-disk drive (such as the head and the electronic channel).

See also 
 Data recovery hardware
 Heat-assisted magnetic recording

References

Hard disk drives